Tamika Scott (born November 19, 1975) is an American Actress and R&B singer and songwriter. She is best known as a member of the multi-platinum selling R&B group Xscape, who rose to popularity in the 1990s.

Early life
Scott was born in Atlanta, Georgia, and at age 4 began singing in church, weddings, and local talent shows. At 9, she had recorded her first song with her sister Latocha. Scott attended Tri-Cities High School of Performing Arts in East Point, Georgia graduating in 1993.

1991–1992: Xscape beginnings 
While attending Tri-Cities performing arts high school in East Point, Georgia, Tamika met Kandi Burruss. The three (along with her sister LaTocha Scott began singing together and recruited a fourth member, Tamera Coggins, though her time with the group was short-lived. Soon Tameka "Tiny" Cottle was asked to audition for the girls, and Xscape was officially formed. After the group's major debut performance at BET's Teen Summit in 1992, the girls were introduced to record executive Ian Burke, who later became the group's manager. Xscape soon caught the attention of Jermaine Dupri, who later signed the group to his So So Def Recordings.

1993–1999: Xscape success 
The group released their debut album Hummin' Comin' at 'Cha on October 12, 1993. The album peaked at number seventeen on the U.S. Billboard 200 and number three on the Top R&B Albums chart. It was a critical and commercial success, certified platinum within a year, and launched two hit singles, "Just Kickin' It" and "Understanding"; both entered the top 10 on the Billboard Hot 100 and peaked at number one on the Hot R&B/Hip-Hop Songs chart. The follow-up singles, "Love on My Mind" and "Tonight", did not achieve the same success. The group later appeared on The Mask soundtrack and the soundtrack for the 1995 film Panther, featuring the single "Freedom", which she appeared with her older sister LaTocha and other female singers.

Xscape released their second studio album, Off the Hook, in 1995. Much of the album's production was by Jermaine Dupri and featured guest vocals from MC Lyte. Four singles were released. "Feel So Good" and "Who Can I Run To" peaked at No. 32 and No. 8 on the Billboard Hot 100 chart respectively. The latter release, "Can't Hang/Do You Want To", was a joint single and reached the top ten of the Billboard R&B charts. "Off the Hook" was certified platinum in 1995. In 1996, the group was featured on MC Lyte's single "Keep On, Keepin' On", which appeared on the Sunset Park soundtrack. The single reached the top 10 on the Billboard Hot 100 chart. In 1997, as the group's popularity grew, they appeared on the soundtracks of the films Love Jones and Soul Food.

In 1997, the group found new management and released their third studio album, Traces of My Lipstick in 1998. The album entered the Billboard 200 at number 28, and featured top 10 hits "The Arms of the One Who Loves You" and "My Little Secret", which LaTocha Scott co-wrote with Jermaine Dupri, earning the pair an ASCAP Rhythm and Soul Music Award. In early 1998, Xscape was featured on the Keith Sweat-produced single, "Am I Dreamin'", by R&B newcomer group Ol' Skool.

1999: Xscape disbandment 
The dynamic of the group had changed by the third album, which led to LaTocha Scott leaving the group in 1999 to pursue a solo career. Subsequently, the group went on hiatus.

2000–2009: After Xscape 
In 2004, Scott, along with LaTocha Scott, Tameka "Tiny" Cottle, and new member Kiesha Miles, attempted to revamp Xscape. They released the single "What's Up" in 2005, but the reconciliation was short-lived and the group ultimately disbanded in 2005.

Around the same time, Scott made her first TV appearance in a 2004 episode of Tyler Perry's Meet the Browns.

2010–present 
Tamika Scott released a new single entitled "Greatest Gift" for Tyler Perry's Daddy's Little Girls, released in 2007. Also Released a single named Why did I Get Married That Same Year

She made a special appearance in the second season of the TV One show R&B Divas: Atlanta in 2013.

When Xscape reunited in 2017, they announced they would be releasing a biopic about the band. In the biopic, Scott plans to be played by her daughter. The band was followed by Bravo as they prepared for the 2017 Essence Festival. The footage was made into a four-part television series called Xscape: Still Kickin' It. Tensions arose between band members during the show, and when asked about how the band was doing, Scott joked that they needed therapy.

In 2017, Scott had a "wardrobe malfunction" on stage when she tripped over her jumpsuit and fell. Scott revealed on Watch What Happens Live with Andy Cohen that when she got pregnant while in Xscape, her producers threatened to kick her out of the band if she didn't have an abortion. She refused and had her daughter Oshun. Scott was spotted with crutches in 2018, and when questioned she admitted she'd injured herself on a home-installed sex swing with her husband.

On March 25, 2019, Tamika released her first solo project since her reunion with Xscape. A single entitled "Tonite" was released to her official SoundCloud and YouTube channel.

On August 9, 2019, Tamika released her new single "Almost Over". It was announced on August 15, 2019 by Here TV & BroadwayWorld that Scott had joined season two of the television series Conframa from executive producer Shaun Cairo Pitchfork (film).

Personal life 
Tamika has three grandchildren. Her daughter Oshun married her middle school sweetheart Aaron in 2014. In 2018, O’shun Reney gave birth to her first daughter Aveyah; her second daughter Aria in 2020; and her third child and first son Cason in October 2021.

Discography 

Singles
 "Greatest Gift" (2007)
 "Almost Over" (2019)

EP
 "Family Affair"

Filmography

References

External links 

1975 births
Living people
Musicians from Atlanta
American rhythm and blues singer-songwriters
American women singer-songwriters
20th-century African-American women singers
African-American women singer-songwriters
21st-century American women singers
21st-century American singers
21st-century African-American women singers
Singer-songwriters from Georgia (U.S. state)